Tlawng Dam, is a proposed rock-fill dam on the Tlawng River near Lungleng, 25 km from Aizawl, in the state of Mizoram in India.

History
A memorandum of understanding was signed between the Mizoram Government and Shyam Century Ferrous on 10 August 2012.

See also

 Chimtuipui River
 Lungleng River

References

Hydroelectric power stations in Mizoram
Proposed dams in India
Dams in Mizoram
Rock-filled dams
Buildings and structures under construction in India